The canton of La Grand-Combe is an administrative division of the Gard department, southern France. Its borders were modified at the French canton reorganisation which came into effect in March 2015. Its seat is in La Grand-Combe.

It consists of the following communes:
 
Aujac
Bonnevaux
Branoux-les-Taillades
Cendras
Chambon
Chamborigaud
Concoules
Corbès
Génolhac
La Grand-Combe
Lamelouze
Laval-Pradel
Malons-et-Elze
Mialet
Ponteils-et-Brésis
Portes
Saint-Bonnet-de-Salendrinque
Sainte-Cécile-d'Andorge
Sainte-Croix-de-Caderle
Saint-Jean-du-Gard
Saint-Paul-la-Coste
Saint-Sébastien-d'Aigrefeuille
Les Salles-du-Gardon
Sénéchas
Soustelle
Thoiras
Vabres
La Vernarède

References

Cantons of Gard